SS Capella (T-AKR 293) is an Algol class vehicle cargo ship that is currently maintained by the United States Maritime Administration as part of the Military Sealift Command's Ready Reserve Force (RRF).  She was built as a high speed container ship by Rotterdamsche D.D.Mij N.V. in Rotterdam, Netherlands, hull no. 330, for Sea-Land Service, Inc. and named SS Sea-Land McLean, USCG ON 540413, IMO 7223508, after Sea-Land's founder Malcom McLean. Due to her high operating cost, she was sold to the United States Navy on 16 April 1982 as USNS Capella (T-AK-293).

In keeping with the pattern of the naming the Algol-class ships after bright stars, the Capella was named after Capella, the brightest star in the constellation Auriga, the sixth brightest in the night sky.

Conversion
Conversion began on 23 October 1982 at Pennsylvania Shipbuilding in Chester, Pennsylvania.  Her cargo hold was redesigned into a series of decks connected by ramps so vehicles can be driven into and out of the cargo hold for fast loading and unloading.  She was also fitted with two sets of two cranes; one set located at midship capable of lifting 35 tons, and another set located aft capable of lifting 50 tons. She was delivered to the Military Sealift Command on 1 July 1984 as USNS Capella (T-AKR 293).

Service
When not active, Capella is kept in reduced operating status due to her high operating cost.  If needed, she can be activated and ready to sail in 96 hours.  Capella took part in the Persian Gulf War in 1990.  Along with the other seven Algol class cargo ships, she transported 14 percent of all cargo delivered between the United States and Saudi Arabia during and after the war. In 1994, Capella, along with USNS Denebola (T-AKR-289), worked with NATO forces on convoy exercises in the Mediterranean.

On 1 October 2007, Capella was transferred to the United States Maritime Administration.  On 1 October 2008, she was transferred to the Ready Reserve Force at Ready Reserve Fleet Alameda, losing her USNS designation. If activated, Capella will report to the Military Sealift Command.

References

 

Ships built in Rotterdam
Cargo ships of the United States Navy
Algol-class vehicle cargo ships
1972 ships
Cold War auxiliary ships of the United States
Gulf War ships of the United States